Kathy Ann Najimy (born February 6, 1957) is an American actress and activist. She is best known for her roles in the films Soapdish (1991), Sister Act (1992), Hocus Pocus (1993), Hope Floats (1998), The Wedding Planner (2001), Rat Race (2001), and  Hocus Pocus 2 (2022), as well as her portrayal of Olive Massery on the NBC sitcom Veronica's Closet (1997–2000) and for voicing Peggy Hill on the animated television series King of the Hill (1997–2010).

She also starred in Disney and Pixar's Academy Award winning film WALL-E (2008),  Step Up 3D (2010), The Guilt Trip (2012), Tyler Perry's A Madea Christmas (2013), A Christmas Melody (2015), Dumplin' (2018), Music (2021), and Single All the Way (2021).

She was first nationally known for her feminist play The Kathy and Mo Show, which she wrote and performed with Mo Gaffney.

Early life
Najimy was born on February 6, 1957, in San Diego, California, the daughter of Lebanese-American parents Samia (née Massery; 1928–2015) and Fred Najimy, a postal worker. Her mother immigrated from Lebanon to the United States in 1946. She was raised Maronite Catholic and attended Crawford High School. Her father died when she was 14. She is a 1995 graduate of San Diego State University.

Career
Najimy and Mo Gaffney's feminist comedy play The Kathy and Mo Show premiered in 1986 and had three long term New York City runs and generated two HBO specials, Parallel Lives and The Dark Side.

Najimy's film career began in the early 1990s, with a number of offbeat minor roles in The Fisher King, Soapdish, This Is My Life, The Hard Way. Her first major role was as Sister Mary Patrick in the 1992 comedy Sister Act, a role she reprised in 1993 in Sister Act 2. She also starred in Hocus Pocus as Mary Sanderson, alongside Bette Midler and Sarah Jessica Parker, and the 1994 made-for-TV movie In Search of Dr. Seuss as Kathy Lane. In 2000, she played the Stepmother in CinderElmo, a primetime special for Sesame Street.  In 2001, she co-starred in the hit comedy film Rat Race alongside John Cleese, Rowan Atkinson, Cuba Gooding, Jr., Whoopi Goldberg, Jon Lovitz and Seth Green.  She has made four movies with Goldberg (Soapdish, Sister Act 1 and 2, and Rat Race). Najimy starred in Disney and Pixar's Academy Award winning film WALL-E and Tyler Perry's A Madea Christmas.

From film, Najimy expanded into television roles, including a dramatic recurring role on Chicago Hope, She was part of the cast of Veronica's Closet from 1997 to 2000. She played Wendy Keegan in HBO's Veep for four seasons. She appeared with Ellen DeGeneres in three episodes of her sitcom Ellen, playing a different character each time (including a non-speaking cameo in the iconic "Puppy Episode") and in the TV movie If These Walls Could Talk 2. Najimy was a series regular season 4 of Unforgettable, season 4 of The Big C, and season 3 of Numbers. She guest starred on That's So Raven, Drop Dead Diva, Desperate Housewives, Ugly Betty, and Franklin & Bash. She starred in TNT's In Search of Dr. Seuss.

Najimy starred as Mae West in the Broadway hit Dirty Blonde. She appeared in V'Day's Vagina Monologues on Broadway and in Nassim Soleimanpour's plays White Rabbit Red Rabbit and Nassim. She is the co-creator and director of the musical revue Back to Bacharach and David, which ran in New York City in 1992 and 1993, and which she directed again in Los Angeles in April 2009.

Najimy starred as Peggy Hill in Fox's King of the Hill from 1997 to 2010. Her voice is featured in the animated films Brother Bear 2, The Jungle Book: Mowgli’s Story, Cats Don't Dance, and Tinkerbell. She has also lent her voice to hundreds of animated television shows and movies, including BoJack Horseman, Rapunzel's Tangled Adventure, American Dad!, Hercules, Pepper Ann, and played a role in the Nightmare Ned video game. In 2003, Najimy provided the voice of Margalo in Stuart Little: The Animated Series, taking over from Melanie Griffith, and in 2000 took over from Madeline Kahn as Mrs. Shapiro in Little Bill. She stars in Disney Junior's reboot of The Rocketeer and Amy Poehler's Duncanville.

Premiering in August 2015, Najimy appeared in Disney's Descendants as the Evil Queen. Later that year, she took part in the successful Christmas TV movie A Christmas Melody starring Mariah Carey, Brennan Elliott, Lacey Chabert and Fina Strazza. It debuted on the Hallmark Channel on December 19, 2015. The film was viewed by 3.95 million people upon its debut.

She appeared in Netflix's 2018 film Dumplin' alongside Jennifer Aniston. Dumplin''' was released on December 7, 2018, on the platform.

In 2021, she appeared in musical drama film Music, directed by singer-songwriter Sia. In the United States, it was released in select IMAX theatres for one night on February 10, 2021, and was followed by a premium video on demand release across the country on February 12. The same year, she starred in the Netflix Christmas romantic comedy Single All the Way alongside Michael Urie, Philemon Chambers and Jennifer Coolidge.
During its debut week, Single All the Way ranked at number 6 on Netflix's top 10 weekly rankings for English-language films, based on its methodology of measuring a film or TV show by the number of hours it was viewed, with 13.82 million hours watched. It also ranked in the weekly top 10 on Netflix in 42 countries. In the second week of release, it had a viewership of 11.14 million hours and ranked at number 5 on Netflix's chart, while remaining in the top 10 Netflix rankings in 36 countries.

Other work
Najimy is an activist and frequently travels the country to speak on issues of equal rights, safety, and self esteem for women and girls, LGBTQ rights, AIDS awareness, domestic violence, body image, and civil rights. She has spoken at the Human Rights Campaign, Planned Parenthood, and PFLAG. She was a surrogate speaker for Hillary Clinton's 2016 presidential campaign. In 2004, Najimy was Ms. Magazines Woman of the Year and a speaker at the March for Women's Lives. She is an active member of Time's Up.

Najimy has also worked with PETA on a number of animal welfare issues and posed with Todd Oldham for the "I'd Rather Go Naked Than Wear Fur" campaign. PETA gave her their Humanitarian of the Year award in 2000 and their Compassionate Action Award in 2014.

Najimy is a strong advocate for women's health and reproductive rights. She contributed to the groundbreaking book, The Choices We Made, which includes testimonials from women who believe in choice. Najimy is vocal about issues regarding body image among women. In August 2006 she voiced her opinions over a remark made by Heidi Klum on the television series Project Runway after Klum said one model's outfit made her look plus-sized, which Najimy called "dangerous" and "irresponsible".

Najimy created and produced the off-Broadway play Gloria: A Life, about the life of activist Gloria Steinem. Starting in 2012, Najimy has been creating, directing, and co-writing personal monologues with actresses including Olivia Wilde, Amy Schumer, Zosia Mamet, Debra Messing, Rosie Perez, and Gabourey Sidibe. The pieces have been performed at Glamour Magazine's live evening of personal monologues titled "These Girls" and at the 2017 and 2018 MAKERS conference. Najimy is currently working on a documentary about the 53% of white women who voted for Donald Trump in 2016. She has performed her solo show, Lift Up Your Skirt, at many venues including the Adelaide Cabaret Festival, ICONS at Fire Island, and Feinstein's at The Nikko in San Francisco. She is also currently producing a television series about the women's movement.

Najimy uses her celebrity status to donate money to charities by appearing on game shows. She appeared as a contestant on a celebrity version of The Weakest Link where she won $50,000 for The Feminist Majority Foundation's Campaign to Stop Gender Apartheid in Afghanistan. She won the season 6 tournament of Celebrity Poker Showdown, donating the $100,000 to V-Day, an organization that helps stop violence against women and girls. She was also crowned Grand Champion on CBS's Gameshow Marathon in 2006, donating the $100,000 winnings to Girls Best Friend, a charity that helps empower girls. In 2013, Najimy was a contestant on Rachael vs. Guy: Celebrity Cook-Off on Team Rachael where she was playing for PETA, cooking only vegetarian food. She was eliminated on the Feb 3 episode, reaching third place.

Before she became a known actress, in 1981, Najimy was a contestant on Family Feud, which was used as the finale in Gameshow Marathon. Najimy and her family were winners on both shows. Najimy also appeared on the $25,000 Pyramid as a civilian contestant, on the episode dated July 31, 1985. She claimed, on the Pyramid show, that she also had been on American Bandstand. She returned to the "Pyramid" (The $100,000 Pyramid'') on the June 26, 2016, episode as a celebrity guest opposite Rosie O'Donnell. She appeared once again in Season 2, Episode 7 on July 23, 2017, to play against Alexandra Wentworth, helping her contestant partner win the $150,000 grand prize.

Personal life
When she was 18, Najimy had an abortion. She advocates for pro-choice. Najimy married actor and singer Dan Finnerty of The Dan Band in August 1998. Gloria Steinem officiated the ceremony. Najimy and Finnerty have one daughter, musician Samia.

Filmography

Film

Television

Video games

Music videos

Theater

References

External links

Official website

1957 births
Living people
American people of Arab descent
American people of Lebanese descent
Activists from California
Actresses from San Diego
Actresses from New York City
American feminists
American film actresses
American television actresses
American voice actresses
American women comedians
Annie Award winners
Contestants on American game shows
American LGBT rights activists
California Democrats
21st-century American women